UFC Fight Night: Barnett vs. Nelson (also known as UFC Fight Night 75) was a mixed martial arts event held on September 27, 2015, at Saitama Super Arena in Saitama, Japan.

Background
The event was the fourth that the organization has hosted in Saitama, following UFC 144 in February 2012, UFC on Fuel TV: Silva vs. Stann in March 2013, and UFC Fight Night: Hunt vs. Nelson in September 2014.

The event was headlined by a heavyweight bout between former UFC Heavyweight champion Josh Barnett and The Ultimate Fighter 10 heavyweight winner Roy Nelson.  Both men had coached opposite each other on the show Road to UFC: Japan.

The featherweight final of Road to UFC: Japan, a new UFC reality series that was held in conjunction with the event, was featured on the card.  The bout ended in a split draw, a first for the reality show series finale fights. During the show, the UFC announced that as a result of the draw both fighters would receive six-figure UFC contracts.

Roan Carneiro was expected to face Gegard Mousasi at this event. However, Carneiro was forced to pull out due to injury and was replaced by Uriah Hall.

Kiichi Kunimoto was expected to face Li Jingliang at this event. However, Kunimoto pulled out of the fight citing injury and was replaced by returning veteran Keita Nakamura.

A bout between Matt Hobar and Norifumi Yamamoto was expected to take place at this event. However, both fighters sustained injuries and were forced to pull out of the fight.

Results

Bonus awards
The following fighters were awarded $50,000 bonuses:
Fight of the Night: None awarded
Performance of the Night: Josh Barnett, Uriah Hall, Diego Brandao and Keita Nakamura

See also
List of UFC events
2015 in UFC

References

UFC Fight Night
Mixed martial arts in Japan
Sport in Saitama (city)
2015 in mixed martial arts
2015 in Japanese sport
September 2015 sports events in Asia